The European Metalworkers' Federation (EMF), founded in 1971, is a federation of 68 metalworkers' unions from 31 countries, representing a combined total of 6.5 million affiliates. It is based in Brussels, Belgium, the general secretary is Ulrich Eckelman and Bart Samyn is the Deputy General Secretary. The organisation was dissolved on 15 May 2012, to become a part - together with EMCEF and ETUF-TCL - of the newly created organisation industriAll European Trade Union on 16 May 2012

External links
 European Metalworkers' Federation

Aims & Tasks 

One of the EMF's main aims is the deepening of the social dimension in the process of European integration.  The EMF contributes to it by representing the economic and social interests of workers in the metal industry at European level.

The EMF advocates a social Europe characterised by democracy, freedom, social justice, and solidarity.  It also defends and promotes the ability of the European social model to face up to future challenges.  At the same time it supports Europe's political and economic integration, whilst bearing in mind the unions' traditions and roots in the culture of their own respective nation-states.  The EMF's core tasks are:

To defend the trade union, social and political interests of the European metalworkers' unions vis-a-vis the European employers' organisations in the metal industry.

To coordinate and implement the initiatives and actions of the European metalworkers' unions at European level.

To serve its member organisations (affiliates) where European interests are involved.

To collaborate with the other federations affiliated to the European Trade Union Confederation (ETUC).

To represent the European interests of the metalworkers' unions at an international level.

Areas of work in short 

The main areas of work are: Collective Bargaining Policy, Industrial Policy, Company Policy and the Social Dialogue.

Collective Bargaining Policy includes the coordination of wage policy, the harmonisation of working time policy and the joint approach to training policy through collective agreement.  The EMF also plays an active role in intersectoral negotiations at a European level.

Industrial Policy focuses on keeping and developing a strong manufacturing base in Europe and future employment interests of workers in the European metal industry.  The EMF is helping to structure the changes in the metal industry brought about by globalisation and seeks to strike a balance between employment interests and competitiveness in its representation of its members' interests.

Company Policy focuses on all elements of workers' interests in a multinational company ranging from economic and industrial development, restructuring and reorganisation and working conditions.  It covers information and consultation rights at European level (European Works Councils, EWC) as well as participation rights (Company Statute).  At the same time the EMF supports the development of a negotiation role in multinational companies. The EMF company policy involves the European Works Councils, the workers' representatives on company boards, the national trade unions and the EMF EWC coordinators.

The Social Dialogue focuses on building lasting dialogue structures with European-level employers’ and industry associations in the metal sector.  The Social Dialogue is being developed at the metal sectoral level with the employers’ organisation CEEMET as well as at the level of sub-sectors such as the shipbuilding and steel industries.  Through the Social Dialogue the EMF seeks to develop common solutions to meet the challenges of global competition and industrial change affecting the metalworking sector across Europe.  The EMF strives to improve the economic and social situation of workers by reconciling the legitimate social interests of workers and the need for competitive industries.

Tools 

The EMF seeks consensus and reconciliation of interests through information, consultation and negotiation.

The most important tools are:
Dialogue with and the submission of demands to European institutions such as the Council, Parliament and the Commission.
Dialogue and the proactive defence of workers' demands in the context of cooperation with European metal industry employers, industry federations and multinational companies.  Initiating and coordinating cross-border European actions aimed at enforcing union demands in the European metal industry.  The negotiation of positions and framework agreements on the basis of the EMF Statutes.
Information and guidance about developments at European level.

Statutes & Work Programme 

The statutes of the European Metalworkers' Federation were adopted by the second EMF Congress that took place on 13–14 June 2003 in Prague.

The Statutes consist the following headlines:
I. Aim, Name, Admission, Object, Composition
II. Organs and decision making
III. Finances
Appendix I: List of EMF Affiliates
List of Associate members
Appendix II
Rules for EMF elections
Work Programme

The EMF Work Programme was adopted by the second Congress on 13–14 June 2003 in Prague.

The Work Programme contains the following headlines:
Introduction
Collective Bargaining
Industrial Policy
Automobile
Aerospace
Steel
Information and Communication Technologies
Shipbuilding
Defence
Lifts
Training and Education
Equal Opportunities
Company Policy
Social Dialogue
Enlargement
Infrastructure Needs
Training Needs

Structure & Composition

Congress 

The congress is the highest EMF statutory body and meets every four years. It is composed of 250 delegates and advisors from organisations affiliated to the EMF.
Congress takes decisions regarding elections, affiliations, financial issues, the Statutes, the basic policy guidelines and the work programme of the EMF.
The latest Congress took place on 13–14 June 2003 in Prague and the next Congress takes place in Lisbon on 6–7 June 2007.

Executive committee 

The Executive Committee is the decision making body of the EMF in between Congresses. The Executive Committee consists of 65 members from 67 affiliated organisations in 30 countries and meets twice a year. It is chaired by EMF President Tony Janssen.

Steering Committee 

The Steering Committee was established in June 1999 as a body that shall advise and support the Secretaiat in the preparation and implementation of the Executive Committee decisions. It comprises the President, the Vice-President and regional representatives from the seven EMF regions as established by the Statutes.

Secretariat 

The Secretariat implements the decsisons of the Executive Committee and prepares the meetings. It consists of 16 staff members and is led by the General Secretary.

Sector Committees

Aerospace

Automotive 
The car sector and its related sub-sectors is a key player in European industry. High-tech performance and quality, environmental aspects and future oriented examples of flexibility lay the ground for a high level of employment. The EMF contributes to all issues related to industrial policy especially the future of the automotive industry in Europe and working conditions. Technological development and environmental needs are decisive elements with regard to transport policy.

Defence

ICT 
The ICT sector in Europe is facing a number of challenges, including mass redundancies in developed countries, skill shortages, outsourcing and off-shoring, structural mutation from hardware production towards software and services, and increasing pressure on salary levels and benefits. A trade union strategy has to address these challenges and seek to create conditions which allow a combination of competitiveness, flexibility and social cohesion for Europe.
Driven by globalisation, swift technological and process changes, global sourcing and stock market fluctuation, the ICT sector is constantly restructuring. We will have to focus on the effectiveness and the quality of change management in order to achieve higher competitiveness and better employment in Europe.

Lift

Non-ferrous metals 
The situation within the non-ferrous metals sector clearly indicates that steps have to be taken to protect this industry, its locations and employees in Europe and provide it with real prospects for sustainability and further development.

Shipbuilding

Steel
The European Steel industry has undergone substantial changes due to the concentration process started in the mid-1990s, in parallel with the privatisation of the state owned steel companies and the globalisation of the steel market.  This process has been given fresh impetus by the surge in demand for steel in China and the substantial increases in the price of all steel products during 2004. The EMF is convinced that there will be further concentration of production in the industry and that further company mergers will follow.

Ad hoc group mechanical engineering 
In 2005 the EMF has re-introduced a working structure for the engineering sector in order to develop policies for the sustainable development of the sector and guarantee a stable and highly skilled labour in Europe.

 
European Trade Union Confederation
International Metalworkers' Federation
Metal trade unions
Trade unions established in 1971
Trade unions disestablished in 2012